Şenköy can refer to:

 Şenköy
 Şenköy, Çivril
 Şenköy, Dursunbey
 Şenköy, İspir